Lakhisarai Junction also called Luckeesarai Junction station code LKR, is one of the major railway junctions in East Central Railway. Lakhisarai is connected to metropolitan areas of India, by the Delhi–Kolkata Main Line via Mugalsarai–Patna route which runs along the historic Grand Trunk Road.

Line and locations 
Lakhisarai Junction located on the bank of Kiul River serves the headquarters of Lakhisarai district in the Indian state of Bihar. Railways and roads are the main means of transport in the region. The district headquarters has the presence of Danapur division's main line along with Sahibganj loop loop line. The Kiul–Nawada–Gaya branch line also starts from the Kiul Junction near to Lakhisarai. Lakhisarai has a religious importance as it is the place where Mahavira, Tirthankara of Jainism, achieved Kevala Jnana. The Lakhisarai railway station is in Howrah–Patna–Mughalsarai main line. Most of the Patna, Barauni-bound express trains coming from Howrah, Sealdah, Ranchi, Tatanagar  stop here.

Facilities 
The major facilities available are waiting rooms, computerized reservation facility, reservation counter, vehicle parking.  The vehicles are allowed to enter the station premises. The station also has STD/ISD/PCO telephone booth, toilets, tea stall and book stall. Automatic ticket vending machines have been installed to reduce the queue for train tickets on the station.

Platform 
There is five platforms. The platforms are interconnected with foot overbridge.

Connections
The nearest airports to Lakhisarai Station are:
Gaya Airport 
Lok Nayak Jayaprakash Airport, Patna 
Birsa Munda Airport, Ranchi  
Netaji Subhash Chandra Bose International Airport, Kolkata

References

External links 
 
 Official website of the Lakhisarai district

Railway stations in Lakhisarai district
Railway junction stations in Bihar
Danapur railway division
Railway stations opened in 1864